Nonlabens marina is a Gram-negative, aerobic and rod-shaped bacterium from the genus of Nonlabens which has been isolated from seawater from the Pacific Ocean.

References

Flavobacteria
Bacteria described in 2013